Christos Kollias (born December 13, 1986 in Amaroussion, Greece) is a Greek basketball player. He is 1.90m (6 ft 2+ in) tall and plays the shooting guard position. He currently plays for Papagou B.C.

Career 
He has played for the youth team of Panathinaikos Athens. In 2004 he transferred to Pagrati BC and played there for 3 years. In 2007-2008 he played for Halkida BC. He has also played for AS Ionikos Neas Filadelfeias BC 2008-2009.

References 

Greek men's basketball players
Living people
1986 births
Shooting guards
Basketball players from Athens